USS Hawaii (CB-3) was intended to be the third member of the  large cruisers. It was the first United States Navy ship to be named after the then-Territory of Hawaii. Because Hawaiis construction was delayed by higher-priority ships like aircraft carriers, her keel was not laid until December 1943, about two years after her sister ship .

Hawaii was launched in late 1945, but post-war budget cutbacks necessitated her cancellation in 1947. In a famous Proceedings article in January 1949, Frank Uhlig dismissed the performance of the class in 1944–1945 and concluded the battlecruiser had no place in the postwar USN. For a time, the US Navy planned to convert the ship into the US' first guided missile cruiser, but this did not come to fruition. A conversion to a large command ship was later contemplated and planning went far enough that money was allocated in the 1952 budget for this purpose. However, with one command ship already completed, and a second already chosen, no work was started upon Hawaii. Having been laid up for twelve years, the still incomplete ship was towed to breakers to be scrapped in 1959.

Design and description

The initial impetus for the design of the Alaska class came from the commerce-raiding abilities of German and Japanese ships; the three s, the two s and Japan's large force of both heavy and light cruisers. By the time that they were built, their role had expanded to protect carrier groups. It was thought that the class's bigger guns, greater size and higher speed would give them a marked advantage in this role over heavy cruisers and they would also provide insurance against reports that Japan was building "super cruisers" more powerful than American cruisers limited by the London Naval Treaty.

She carried four floatplanes, housed in two hangars, with a pair of aircraft catapults mounted amidships.

The ship was armed with a main battery of nine 12 inch (305 mm) L/50 Mark 8 guns in three triple-gun turrets, two in a superfiring pair forward and one aft of the superstructure. The secondary battery consisted of twelve 5-inch (127 mm) L/38 dual-purpose guns in six twin turrets. Two were placed on the centerline superfiring over the main battery turrets, fore and aft; the remaining four turrets were placed on the corners of the superstructure. The light anti-aircraft battery consisted of 56 quad-mounted  Bofors guns and 34 single-mounted  Oerlikon guns. A pair of Mk 34 gun directors aided gunlaying for the main battery, while two Mk 37 directors controlled the 5-inch guns and a Mk 57 director aided the 40 mm guns.

Construction, conversion proposals and eventual fate 
Along with the five s and the final three Alaska-class cruisers, the construction of Hawaii was suspended in May 1942 before work began. This freed materials and facilities so that they could be used to build additional ships which could be completed faster and were needed in the war zones, like anti-submarine escorts. Over  of steel plates and shapes which had been destined for Hawaii was redirected to other ships in July 1942. However, Hawaii was added back onto the construction queue on 25 May 1943, unlike CB-4 through CB-6, which were cancelled on 24 June 1943. Her keel was laid on 20 December 1943, and she was finally launched on 3 November 1945, about two years after Guam. The ship was sponsored by Mary P. Farrington, the wife of the delegate from the Territory of Hawaii to the United States House of Representatives, Joseph Farrington. After her launch, little, if any, work was done before construction was halted in either February or April 1947 due to the reduction in defense expenditures after World War II; the ship was 82.4% complete when work was halted. The turrets for the main battery had been fitted and the superstructure was mostly finished, although the former were removed when the ship was moved into the reserve fleet at the Philadelphia Naval Shipyard.

Aircraft carrier conversion 
Hawaii was considered under project SCB 26 for a conversion to an aircraft carrier, with an aircraft crane and twin aircraft catapults to be added on the stern of the ship. The conversion, as envisioned, would have looked similar to a completed . The ship would have also been able to launch the JB-2 "Loon" cruise missile from a hydraulic catapult installed on her forward flight deck. The conversion was authorized in the same year (1948) and was scheduled to be completed in 1950; the ship's classification was changed to CBG-3 to reflect the planned overhaul. However, the conversion was canceled in 1949, along with any other plans for surface ships equipped with ballistic missiles, due to the volatility of the rocket fuels and the shortcomings with guidance systems that were available.

Guided-missile cruiser designs 
Similar to the unfinished battleship , Hawaii was considered for a conversion to be a test platform for the development of guided missiles in September 1946. Designated CB(SW), the cruisers' gun armament would have consisted of sixteen 3-inch (76 mm) L70 guns in eight dual mounts. Most missiles would have been mounted toward the bow, while two "missile launching pits" would be located near the stern. For this task, no armor would have been needed and previously installed armor was to be taken off the ship when required. These plans never came to fruition, so Hawaii remained in the Reserve Fleet, still incomplete.

Two years later, in 1948, a similar conversion plan was put forth. This plan, designated project SCB 26A, proposed that Hawaii be converted into a Ballistic Guided Missile Ship. This plan called for Hawaii to be completed with 12 vertical launchers for U.S.-made V-2 short-range ballistic missiles and 6 launchers for the SSM-N-2 Triton surface-to-surface cruise missile. Triton was an attempt to give the Navy a reliable cruise missile that it could launch off of its ships. The design process began with an approval from the U.S. Navy in September 1946. After "formulating performance objectives and possible design baselines", the designers settled on attempting to fit a  ramjet-powered cruiser missile onto solid-fuel rocket boosters that could carry the missile  at Mach 1.6–2.5 in 1950. After lowering the ambitious goals to more realistic levels in 1955, a fully operational version was expected by 1965, but with tests for the SSM-N-9/RGM-15 Regulus II planned for that year and the up-and-coming UGM-27 Polaris submarine-launched cruise missile, the project was terminated in 1957. One source has a variation of this scheme, with the developmental XPM (Experimental Prototype Missile) from Operation Bumblebee replacing the Triton launchers. XPM eventually led to the RIM-8 Talos surface-to-air missile.

Large command ship 

Yet another conversion of Hawaii, this time to a "large command ship", was contemplated under project SCB 83 from August 1951. This conversion would have boasted expansive flag facilities and fully capable radar and communication systems for commanding carrier task forces, though there would have been no facilities for amphibious operations. Armament would have consisted of sixteen 5"/54 caliber guns in single mounts; this gun size was specified because 3-inch/50-caliber guns were believed to be too light. Two radars would have been mounted: an AN/SPS-2 on top of a forward tower and an AN/SPS-8 on the aft superstructure. In addition, an SC-2 was to be mounted on top of a short tower aft of the stack (though forward of the SPS-8); this would have been used for "tropospheric scatter communications".

Two Mk37/25 fire-control directors were planned, both fore and aft of the superstructure. The conversion plans were authorized, and her classification was changed to CBC-1 to reflect this on 26 February 1952. Money to begin the project was included in the 1952 budget, but the only work done on the ship was the removal of the 12" turrets, as it was intended that experience from Northampton should be analyzed before a full conversion. However, when it was seen that a smaller and cheaper ship—like the light carrier —could do the same duty, the Hawaii project was cancelled in 1953. She reverted to her original designation of CB-3 on 9 September 1954.

Polaris study
In February 1957, a study entitled "Polaris Study–CB-3" was published, proposing that Hawaii be stripped of all her guns in favor of twenty Polaris missiles, mounted in the hull vertically in roughly the same location as the third main turret would have been located, two Talos surface-to-air missile (SAM) launchers, one each fore and aft, two Tartar SAMs mounted on either side of the superstructure and a single ASROC anti-submarine weapon mounted where the second main turret would have been placed. Nothing further was done with the study.

Disposal
On 9 June 1958, Hawaii was struck from the Naval Vessel Register and the ship was sold to the Boston Metals Company of Baltimore on 15 April 1959. The still-incomplete Hawaii was towed to Baltimore, arriving there on 6 January 1960 and was subsequently broken up for scrap.

Notes

References

Sources

External links 

 Navy photographs of Hawaii (CB-3) 
 

Alaska-class cruisers
Ships built by New York Shipbuilding Corporation
Cancelled ships of the United States Navy
1945 ships